Siege (John Kelly) is a fictional character appearing in American comic books published by Marvel Comics.

Creative origins
John Kelly was initially created by Dwayne McDuffie and Gregory Wright as a pseudo-preview of their then-upcoming relaunch of Deathlok as well as to provide existing in-continuity backstory for that series prior to its launch. Gregory Wright is solely credited for re-creating him as Siege.

Fictional character biography 
After reverse engineering and deconstructing the body of the original Deathlok, Luther Manning, Harlan Ryker of the Roxxon Oil subsidiary Cybertek Systems built a proto-type of a new, vastly improved Deathlok cyborg. Colonel John Kelly, a disenfranchised veteran of the Vietnam War who had recently been fired from his job as a police officer, volunteered to become a scientific guinea pig, serving as the wetware basis for Ryker's project. The remains of John Kelly's original body have been incorporated into the framework of the Deathlok cyborg. However, in his first outing as the professional soldier Deathlok he rebelled against his computer's pre-programmed mission objectives and the onboard computer system electrocuted his brain as it determined Kelly to be 'malfunctioning.'

Some time later, after Michael Collins had been operating as Deathlok for a number of months, the remains of John Kelly's brain were mutated into the horrific creature called Biohazard. Collins then discovered within the Deathlok computer's databanks a file named "John Kelly." Opening this file he discovered a copy of John Kelly's consciousness preserved as pure data inhabiting the file in a dormant state. Upon his opening of the file, the copy of Kelly infected Michael Collins's own brain operating as a second consciousness to the annoyance of them both.

This situation did not persist long, however, as shortly afterwards Deathlok discovered Harlan Ryker to be working on a new, much improved series of cyborg soldiers, this time with lobotomized brains to avoid the issues he had experienced with both Kelly and Collins. During the ensuing battle the copy of Kelly's consciousness was transferred into the mind of one of the newer cyborgs, freeing Collins from playing host to his unwanted guest and giving Kelly back a semblance of life. As a cyborg, with Deathlok, Silver Sable and the Wild Pack, he battled Mainframe, Ben Jacobs, and the Cyberwarriors. Kelly christened himself Siege after a nickname an old war buddy had given him. With Deathlok and Coldblood, he battled Harlan Ryker, Mainframe, Ben Jacobs, and the Cyberwarriors.

Siege operated as a mercenary for some time working for Silver Sable, S.H.I.E.L.D., and various others. With Silver Sable, the Wild Pack, Next Wave, and the Knights of Wundagore, he battled the Genesis Coalition and the Cyberwarriors. He defeated an airstrike on U.S. troops by a hostile foreign power in the mideast. With Deathlok, he battled Timestream and his mercenaries in Australia. With Deathlok, he experienced the Goddess's epiphany. Alongside Daredevil, he battled Venom and the Hand. With Deathlok and Godwulf, he battled Timestream, the Demolisher, and Luther Manning in the past.

The Initiative / Marvel Zombies 3
During the Superhero Civil War, Siege joined the Initiative and was assigned to lead the Florida state team the Command, along with Wundarr the Aquarian, Jennifer Kale and the Conquistador. The team investigates a disturbance in the Citrusville swamp (home to the Man-Thing and the Nexus of all Realities). The Conquistador is torn apart. Wundarr is infected but purges himself. Siege is bitten on the face by a zombie and despite his cybernetic nature was quickly turned as well. He attacks Jennifer Kale, saying he only wanted her on the team because of her 'barbarian bikini' outfit she formerly wore. His onboard computer alerts A.R.M.O.R. to the fact that he was seemingly malfunctioning. The cyborg part shoots off Siege's head.

Powers and abilities 
As Siege, John Kelly possesses superhuman strength speed, stamina, and durability, and is said to be stronger than the Michael Collins version of Deathlok. Siege possesses a massive cyborg body. The left half of his face is in a semi-decomposed state. The right half of his face is in an armored cybernetic implant. He is an excellent hand-to-hand combatant with extensive combat training. Siege's built-in database is capable of a myriad of functions, including long-range surveillance and tracking systems and self-diagnostic and repair functions. As Kelly's personality and mental patterns have been encoded into the Siege cyborg body in machine language, Siege is impervious to mental scans. Siege's simplified digestive system can only absorb a liquid nutrient formula; he cannot digest ordinary food. Siege cannot feel any tactile sensations.

He also possesses a wide array of weapons and sensor systems, as well as jet boosters built into his legs enabling flight at supersonic speeds. Siege's cyborg body possesses a built-in Gatling assembly on his right forearm capable of discharging 100 low-yield plasma bursts per second. His right forearm contains a built-in plasma cannon capable of significantly more powerful discharges. He wears a woven metal-mesh body suit of considerable durability. His paraphernalia was designed and manufactured by former Cybertek scientists including Ben Jacobs, Stanley Cross, Dr. Hu, Dr. Fox, and Dr. Borruso.

Possibly because the organic portions of his body are not his own, or possibly because the brain he inhabits was lobotomized, Siege is unable to feel anything physically and has a very limited emotional range. Michael Collins theorized the cause of this was that Siege was not actually John Kelly, but simply a rogue data packet that believed itself to be Kelly; regardless, he has acknowledged that Siege is alive. Siege has described the way he experiences his pseudo-life as being akin to playing a video game.

References

External links

Characters created by Dwayne McDuffie
Comics characters introduced in 1990
Comics characters introduced in 1993
Fictional characters with disfigurements
Fictional Vietnam War veterans
Marvel Comics characters who can move at superhuman speeds
Marvel Comics characters with superhuman strength
Marvel Comics cyborgs
Marvel Comics superheroes
S.H.I.E.L.D. agents